Charlie or Charles Shields may refer to:
 Charles Woodruff Shields (1825–1904), American theologian
 Charles W. Shields (born 1959), American politician
 Charlie Shields (1900s pitcher) (1879–1953), baseball player
 Charlie Shields (1940s pitcher) (1922–1955), Negro league baseball player
 Charles J. Shields (born 1951), American biographer